The 2021–22 Primera División RFEF season was the first for the Primera División RFEF, the new third highest level in the Spanish football league system. It succeeded the old Segunda División B, which renamed itself Segunda División RFEF and downgraded to the fourth level in the pyramid. Forty teams participated, divided into two groups of twenty clubs each based on geographical proximity. In each group, the champions automatically promoted to Segunda División and the second to fifth placers played promotion play-offs and the bottom five were relegated to the Segunda División RFEF.

Overview before the season
A total of 40 teams joined the league, including four relegated from the 2020–21 Segunda División and 36 promoted from the 2020–21 Segunda División B.

Teams relegated from Segunda División

Albacete
Castellón
UD Logroñés
Sabadell

Teams promoted from Segunda División B

Alcoyano
Algeciras
Andorra
Athletic Bilbao B
Atlético Baleares
Atlético Sanluqueño
Badajoz
Barcelona B
Betis Deportivo
Calahorra
Celta Vigo B
Cornellà
Costa Brava 
Cultural Leonesa
Deportivo La Coruña
Extremadura
Gimnàstic
Internacional
Linares
Linense
Racing Ferrol
Racing Santander
Rayo Majadahonda
Real Madrid Castilla
Real Unión
San Fernando
San Sebastián de los Reyes
SD Logroñés
Sevilla Atlético
Talavera de la Reina
Tudelano
UCAM Murcia
Unionistas
Valladolid Promesas
Villarreal B
Zamora

Groups

Group 1

Teams and locations

Personnel and sponsorship

Standings

Results

Group 2

Teams and locations

Personnel and sponsorship

Standings

Results

Final

The winners of the two regular season groups will face off in a single-match neutral site final to determine the champion of the 2021–22 Primera División RFEF season. The match will take place at one of the stadiums designated to host the promotion playoff.

Promotion Playoffs

Teams ranked second through fifth in each of the two groups qualified for the promotion playoff, which determined the last two promotion spots. The eight qualified teams were drawn into two fixed brackets, each containing four teams. All ties consisted of a single neutral-site match. In case of draws, extra time was played; if the match was still level, the team which achieved a higher regular season finish was proclaimed the winner.

Venues

Participating teams 

Deportivo La Coruña
Racing Ferrol
Rayo Majadahonda
UD Logroñés
Albacete
Villarreal B
Gimnàstic de Tarragona
Linares

Brackets

Copa del Rey Qualifiers

The following clubs qualified for the 2022–23 Copa del Rey by virtue of their league finish:

Top goalscorers

See also
2021–22 La Liga
2021–22 Segunda División
2021–22 Segunda División RFEF
2021–22 Tercera División RFEF

References

 
Spain
Primera Federación seasons